James Blount or Blunt may also refer to:

 Sir James Blount (English soldier) (died 1493), sometimes rendered as James Blunt, English military commander
 James A. Blount (1884–1974), American lawyer and politician in Mississippi
 James Henderson Blount (1837–1903), American statesman
 James Blount, 6th Baron Mountjoy (1533–1582), English peer
 James Blunt (born 1974), British musician, whose given name is James Hillier Blount
 James G. Blunt (1826–1881), American general
 Jim Blount (1935–2017), American newspaper editor and historian